Hurricane Island is a 1951 American Supercinecolor adventure film directed by Lew Landers and starring Jon Hall.

Plot
Juan Ponce de León searches for the Fountain of Youth, but it is not an easy quest, thanks to bad weather, a treacherous lady pirate, warring Florida tribesmen, and a ship's cargo of man-hungry, marriage-minded maidens.

Cast
 Jon Hall as Captain Carlos Montalvo
 Marie Windsor as Jane Bolton 
 Romo Vincent as José
 Edgar Barrier as Ponce de Leon 
 Karen Randle as Maria 
 Jo Gilbert as Okahla
 Nelson Leigh as Padre

Production
The film was announced in March 1950 with Robert E. Kent originally reported as writing the script. It was the first in a new three-picture contract between Hall and producer Sam Katzman. They would go on to make Brave Warrior (1952) and Last Train from Bombay (1952).

References

External links

Hurricane Island at TCMDB

1951 films
American historical adventure films
1950s historical adventure films
Columbia Pictures films
Films set in the 16th century
Films set in North America
Films set in the Caribbean
Films set in Florida
Films about conquistadors
1950s English-language films
Films directed by Lew Landers
1950s American films